A panic button is an electronic device designed to assist in alerting somebody (usually the Emergency Services) in emergency situations.

Panic Button may also refer to:

 Panic Button (1964 film), a comedy starring Jayne Mansfield
 Panic Button, a 2007 TV film starring Holly Marie Combs, originally released as Point of Entry (2007 film)
 Panic Button (2011 film), a British horror thriller
 Panic Button Records, an American record label
 Panic Button (company), a video game development studio based in Austin, Texas
 Panic Button, a game show on TruTV